The Dundiya rebellion was a late 18th century uprising against the Ahom kingdom in the Borphukan's domain (Kamrup region).  The rebellion was headed by Haradutta Bujarbarua who, with mercenary troops, managed to occupy most of northern Kamrup before being beaten back. This rebellion took place just as the Moamoria rebellion was on in Upper Assam, but after the Ahom royalists were restored by Captain Welsh in 1792.

Notes

References

 

Ahom kingdom
18th-century rebellions
History of the Kamrup region
18th century in India